The Parkers is an American television sitcom created by Ralph Farquhar, Sara V. Finney and Vida Spears, which aired on UPN from August 30, 1999, to May 10, 2004, lasting five seasons. The series stars Mo'Nique, Countess Vaughn, Mari Morrow, Jenna von Oÿ, Ken L., Yvette Wilson and Dorien Wilson. It centers on the relationship between mother and daughter, Nikki and Kim Parker, who reside in Santa Monica, California, while both attending the local junior college. The series was produced by Big Ticket Television, in association with Saradipity Productions and Regan Jon Productions. Executive Producers were Bill Boulware, Ralph Farquhar, Sara V. Finney, Vida Spears and Andrea Wiley.

Premise
This comedy series centers around a low-income mother and daughter who both attend Santa Monica College. Nikki Parker, who was forced to drop out of high school nearly 20 years earlier when she discovered she was pregnant. As the time arrived for her daughter to go to college, she decided to go as well as a way to get an experience and education that was taken from her so many years earlier.  Through a series of hilarious situations, Nikki has to adjust to the fact her daughter is growing up, while Kim realizes that Nikki has a lot more going on other than being a mother.

Cast and characters

Main

 Kim Parker (Countess Vaughn): A ditzy college student and Nikki's daughter. Although she can be shallow, Kim has a kind heart and is close with Nikki. Kim is also a lead singer in the music group Free Style Unity, which also includes Stevie and T. At the end of series, she fails out of Santa Monica College but becomes a successful fashion designer.

 Nikki Parker (Mo'Nique): A boisterous, confident single mother, who embraces college life to the fullest. She is in love with Professor Oglevee, despite his apparent hatred of her. In the series finale, she eventually wins him over after five years of chasing him and they get married.
 Desiree Littlejohn (Mari Morrow): Initially, the Parkers' neighbor and Nikki's friend. She only appears in the first season and is uncredited as a regular after five episodes. She is not seen after episode 13. It was stated that creator, Ralph Farquhar, wrote her off because he wanted a stronger dynamic with another one of his characters. She was replaced by Yvette Wilson. 
 Stevie Alison Van Lowe (Jenna von Oÿ): A sarcastic, intelligent white college student as well as Kim's best friend. Stevie is from a affluent family and has a tempestuous relationship with her mother. She is also a member of the music group Free Style Unity, alongside Kim and T. Upon graduating from Santa Monica College, Stevie attends UCLA and goes into business with Kim.
 Thaddeus Tyrell "T" Radcliffe (Ken Lawson): A flirtatious, attractive college student as well as friend to Kim and Stevie. He is also a member of the music group Free Style Unity. At the end of the series, T goes on to attend Berklee College of Music.

 Professor Stanley Oglevee (Dorien Wilson): A handsome professor at Santa Monica College. Although he prides himself on his intelligence, he often becomes embroiled in hare-brained schemes, often due to his own foolishness. Although he is initially repulsed by Nikki's affections, he eventually declares his love for her, and they marry in the series finale.
 Andell Wilkerson (Yvette Wilson): Nikki's level-headed best friend. Andell originated as a regular character on Moesha and appears on The Parkers in a recurring role during the first season; she became a main character in the middle of Season 1. From Season 3 onward, she is the owner of a restaurant called Andell's. At the end of the series, she marries her boyfriend, Lester.

Recurring
 Mel Parker (Thomas Mikal Ford): Nikki's rich ex-husband and Kim's father
 Erica Willis (Porscha Coleman)
 Regina Foster (Kara Brock): A snobbish and stuck-up colleague of Nikki, Kim, and Stevie's at Santa Monica College and also a member of the Triple A Sorority.
 Joe Woody (Dwight Woody): Works in the cafeteria at Santa Monica College. He previously played Coach Vines on Moesha.
 Veronica Cooper (Paulette Braxton): On-and-off girlfriend of Professor Oglevee and occasional nemesis of Nikki.
 Sophia Van Lowe (Shannon Tweed): Stevie's mother.
 Gertrude "Gertie" Lowe (Kym Whitley): The organ player at Mount Zion, where Nikki is the choir director. She is occasionally a nemesis of Nikki. She has also known Nikki and Andell since high school.
 Frederick "Freddy" Jones (Kel Mitchell): A flamboyant fashion design student who often has conflict with Kim.
 Hakeem Campbell (Lamont Bentley): Kim's longtime friend and former crush. He was previously on Moesha.
 Niecy Jackson (Shar Jackson): Kim's best friend. She was also on Moesha.
 Symone (Samantha Becker): A backup singer in the group Free Style Unity in Season 1.
 Chandra Carrington (Lark Voorhies): Colleague of Nikki and Kim's at Santa Monica College and also a member the Triple A Sorority.
 Jerel Goodrich (Trent Cameron): Kim's boyfriend turned fiancé; later ex-husband.
 George and Shirley West/Alexander (Earl Billings and Aloma Wright): Nikki's adoptive parents.
 Constance McFarland (Suzzanne Douglas): Nikki's haughty older sister.
 Tiffany McFarland (Cherie Johnson): Nikki's niece.
 Quincy DeJohn (George Wallace): Nikki's biological father.
 Camille Oglevee (Veronica Redd): Professor Oglevee's mother. She tried convince Kim to drop out of college to work for her.
 Aunt Rita (Nancy Wilson): Nikki's aunt, who turned out to be her biological mother. She explained that she was unable to raise Nikki due to her career.
 Evelyn "Nana" Smith (Isabel Sanford): Nikki's grandmother, who comes onto Professor Oglevee while visiting Nikki.

Episodes

Production
The Parkers was produced by Saradipity Productions, Regan Jon Productions (Season 1 only), and Big Ticket Television. Reruns are currently distributed by CBS Television Distribution.

Broadcast

Syndication
The Parkers has aired in syndication on Centric (previously BET J), UP, TV One, VH1, MTV2, and Nick@Nite.

Currently, the series airs reruns on BET, Fuse, and Cleo TV.

The series started streaming on Netflix on October 1, 2020.

International airings
In Europe, the show has aired in Ireland and the UK.  In Ireland, it aired on RTÉ Two from 2000 to 2005, usually airing Thursdays as 7.00pm.  The first four seasons were aired in this evening time slot, with season five beginning in this timeslot and with the few remaining episodes moved to a late night timeslot on Fridays.  After the series finished on RTÉ Two, there have been no re-runs and no current plans to run the show again.  It was also shown on UK channel Trouble, which was also available in Ireland.  It usually aired weekdays from 2000 to 2004 but after it was completely removed, it was shown on a one-off weekend in late 2006, with episodes airing all day. In Australia, it aired on Fox8 and in Jamaica on TVJ.

Reception

Critical response
Although The Parkers initially received mixed reviews and was criticized for its outrageous characters, the series was a ratings success for UPN. Its debut season ranked as the number one comedy on the network; it was the most popular show among black audiences, ahead of The WB’s The Steve Harvey Show. The success of the series has been credited to its ability to relate to many audiences, especially young people.

Ratings

The Parkers series finale aired on May 10, 2004, and drew in 3.6 million viewers.

Awards and nominations

Reunion

In 2009, cast members Countess Vaughn, Jenna von Oÿ, Ken Lawson, and Dorien Wilson appeared on The Mo'Nique Show for a full-length episode, "The Parkers Reunion." Series creator Sara V. Finney was part of the audience for the episode. Yvette Wilson didn't appear due to her busy work schedule.

Home media
The Parkers: The Complete Collection, containing all five seasons, was released on region 1 DVD in Canada via Visual Entertainment in a 14-disc set on 18 March 2016.

Notes

References

External links 
 
 

1990s American college television series
1999 American television series debuts
2004 American television series endings
1990s American black sitcoms
2000s American black sitcoms
2000s American college television series
American television spin-offs
English-language television shows
Television series about families
Television series by CBS Studios
Television shows set in Santa Monica, California
UPN original programming